Jariyeh-e Seyyed Mohammad (also Romanized as Jarīyeh-e Seyyed Moḩammad; also known as Qal‘eh Seyyed Moḩammad, Qal‘eh-ye Moḩammad, Shahīd Mofatteh, and Shahrak-e Mofatteh) is a village in Hoseynabad Rural District, in the Central District of Shush County, Khuzestan Province, Iran. At the 2006 census, its population was 763, in 118 families.

References 

Populated places in Shush County